Márcio Cordeiro de Paula, known as Márcio Cordeiro (born 7 January 1993) is a Brazilian football player who.

Club career
He made his professional debut in the Segunda Liga for Trofense on 10 August 2013 in a game against Benfica B.

References

1993 births
Footballers from São Paulo (state)
Living people
Brazilian footballers
Brazilian expatriate footballers
C.D. Trofense players
Liga Portugal 2 players
Associação Atlética Portuguesa (Santos) players
F.C. Vizela players
Association football defenders
Brazilian expatriate sportspeople in Portugal
Expatriate footballers in Portugal